Longli County is a county of the Qiannan Buyei and Miao Autonomous Prefecture, in central Guizhou Province, China.

Area: .

Population: 205,400 in 2003, including 78,300 population of minority ethnic groups

Postal Code: 551200.

Telephone Area Code: 0854

Transportation
Qiangui Railway
Zhuliu Railway
Xiangqian Railway
China National Highway 210
China National Highway 320

Climate

References

External links
Official website of Longli Government

 
County-level divisions of Guizhou
Qiannan Buyei and Miao Autonomous Prefecture